We Own the Night is a 2007 American neo-noir dramatic crime thriller film directed and written by James Gray, co-produced by and starring Joaquin Phoenix and Mark Wahlberg, and co-starring Eva Mendes and Robert Duvall. It is the third film directed by Gray, and the second to feature Phoenix and Wahlberg together, the first being 2000's The Yards. The title comes from the motto of the NYPD's Street Crimes Unit, which disbanded in 2002.

The film premiered May 25, at the 2007 Cannes Film Festival. It was released in the United States on October 12, 2007. The film received mixed reviews from critics and grossed $55 million.

Plot
In Brooklyn, New York in November 1988, Bobby Green manages the El Caribe nightclub in Brighton Beach, which is owned by his boss, fur importer Marat Buzhayev, and frequented by Marat's nephew, Russian mobster and drug lord Vadim Nezhinski. Having distanced himself from his father, NYPD Deputy Chief Albert "Burt" Grusinsky, and his brother, Captain Joseph Grusinsky, Bobby prefers to use his mother's maiden name, Green, as his last name and stay on the sidelines, enjoying a hedonistic life with his girlfriend Amada Juarez and best friend Louis "Jumbo" Falsetti.

When Joseph, who has recently been appointed as the head of an anti-narcotics unit, leads a police raid on El Caribe, hoping to arrest Vadim, Bobby declines to cooperate. The incident further strains Bobby's relationships with his father and brother, to the point that the siblings come to blows. The police are unsuccessful in making a case against Vadim, who decides to retaliate. The next evening, the night before Thanksgiving, a masked Vadim shoots Joseph in the face outside his house and firebombs his unmarked police cruiser, causing him to be hospitalized at Jamaica Hospital Medical Center for four months. Vadim, unaware of Bobby's family ties, confides that the Chief will be the next victim. Bobby resolves to help the police and, without his father's knowledge, goes undercover inside Vadim's cocaine-smuggling operation with a police listening device hidden in a cigarette lighter. When the device is discovered, he narrowly escapes death as the police raid the operation and arrest Vadim.

Bobby and Amada are placed in protective police custody at the Kew Motor Inn and their relationship begins to deteriorate. When Vadim escapes custody while being transported to a hospital, Burt and the police prepare to move the couple to a new location at the Corona Hotel. During a torrential rainstorm, Vadim's men intercept the police convoy, and during a chaotic car chase Burt is fatally shot. When he sees his father's body, Bobby blacks out in the rain. The police take Bobby and Amada to a room at the Sheraton hotel near Kennedy Airport. After Bobby awakens a few hours later, Joseph tells him that their father has been shot and killed. At the funeral, a colleague of Joseph's, Captain Jack Shapiro, gives him Burt's Korean War medal and informs him that a Russian shipment of cocaine is arriving sometime in the coming week.

To avenge his father, Bobby decides to officially join the police force, infuriating Amada, who leaves him for having decided on such a dangerous career change without consulting her beforehand. After Police Commissioner Patrick Ruddy swears him into the NYPD due to his "special knowledge" about the case, provided that he will have to go to the Police Academy after the case is completed, Bobby interrogates Jumbo, who reveals the true nature of his and Marat's involvement. He and Joseph organize a final sting operation, set for April 4, 1989, which falls on a Tuesday, as Bobby remembers Marat takes his grandchildren, whom he uses as couriers, horse riding at Floyd Bennett Field every Tuesday. During the raid, Joseph is emotionally incapacitated by the memory of his shooting and cannot continue. Bobby grabs Joseph's shotgun, advances with the other officers, and chases Vadim, who vanishes into the reed beds. Unable to find him, Bobby returns to the police, who have arrested Marat. As the police toss in flares to smoke Vadim out, engulfing the beds in flame and smoke, he runs in to find Vadim himself, ignoring the other officers' pleas that he wait. He eventually locates Vadim and mortally wounds him by shooting him in the chest.

Nearly a year after the raid on El Caribe, Bobby, now in uniform, graduates from the NYPD Police Academy to become a full-time police officer. Before the ceremony, Joseph reveals to Bobby that he has decided to switch to a job in the administration sector, since the shooting led him to realize that he needs to spend more time with his children. As the chaplain announces that Bobby is to give the valedictorian address, Bobby thinks he sees Amada in the audience, but it turns out to be an illusion. Bobby and Joseph express their brotherly love.

Cast
 Joaquin Phoenix as Robert Grusinsky / Bobby Green
 Mark Wahlberg as Captain Joe Grusinsky
 Eva Mendes as Amada Juarez
 Robert Duvall as Deputy Chief Albert "Burt" Grusinsky
 Antoni Corone as Lieutenant Michael Solo
 Moni Moshonov as Marat Buzhayev
 Oleg Taktarov as Pavel Lubyarski
 Danny Hoch as Louis "Jumbo" Falsetti
 Tony Musante as Captain Jack Shapiro
 Paul Herman as Deputy Commissioner Spiro Giavannis
 Alex Veadov as Vadim Nezhinski
 Dominic Colon as Freddie
 Craig Walker as Detective Russell De Keifer
 Fred Burrell as Commissioner Patrick Ruddy
 Edward Conlon as Hospital Guard
 Yelena Solovey as Kalina Buzhayev
 Coati Mundi as himself
 Ed Koch, who was Mayor of New York City during the time frame in which the film is set, makes a cameo appearance as himself.

Reception

Critical response 

On Rotten Tomatoes, 57% of 153 critics gave the film positive reviews, with an average rating of 5.8/10. The website's critical consensus reads, "Bland characters, clichéd dialogue and rickety plotting ensure We Own The Night never lives up to its potential." On Metacritic, the film has a weighted average score of 59 out of 100, based on 33 critics, indicating "mixed or average reviews". Audiences surveyed by CinemaScore gave the film a grade "B−" on an A+ to F scale.

Roger Ebert of the Chicago Sun-Times wrote: "This is an atmospheric, intense film, well acted, and when it's working it has a real urgency." Peter Travers of Rolling Stone called it "defiantly, refreshingly unhip" and gave it 3 out of 4.

Box office 

In its opening weekend in the United States and Canada, the film grossed $10.8 million in 2,362 theaters, ranking #3 at the box office. The film grossed a total of $54.5 million worldwide — $28.6 million in the United States and Canada and $26.5 million in other territories.

Sony Pictures paid $11 million for the rights to distribute the film domestically. The studio released it through its Columbia Pictures division.

By June 2017, the film had totaled $22 million in DVD sales and $32 million in DVD rentals.

References

External links
 
 
 
 

2007 films
2000s English-language films
2007 crime thriller films
2007 crime drama films
American crime thriller films
American crime drama films
American gangster films
American neo-noir films
Columbia Pictures films
Films about the New York City Police Department
Films about the Russian Mafia
Films directed by James Gray
Films produced by Joaquin Phoenix
Films produced by Mark Wahlberg
Films scored by Wojciech Kilar
Films set in 1988
Films set in 1989
Films set in Brooklyn
Films with screenplays by James Gray
Universal Pictures films
Films about brothers
Films about father–son relationships
2000s American films